Péter Parsch (born 20 January 1936) is a Hungarian middle-distance runner. He competed in the men's 800 metres at the 1960 Summer Olympics.

References

1936 births
Living people
Athletes (track and field) at the 1960 Summer Olympics
Hungarian male middle-distance runners
Olympic athletes of Hungary
Place of birth missing (living people)
20th-century Hungarian people